was an admiral in the Imperial Japanese Navy during World War II.

Biography

Early career
A native of what is now the town of Mikawa, Yamagata prefecture in northern Japan, Abe was a graduate of the 40th class of the Imperial Japanese Naval Academy in 1912. He ranked 73rd out of 144 cadets. He returned to naval artillery and torpedo school later that year, and did not graduate until late 1917, so he was unable to participate in combat operations in World War I.

He was promoted to captain on 15 November 1934.

Abe was given his first command on November 15, 1935, the cruiser .

Abe was promoted to rear admiral on November 15, 1940. He commanded the transport division for the Port Moresby Invasion Force in abortive Operation Mo during the Battle of the Coral Sea.

The Makin Raid incident
From February 5, 1942 – November 29, 1943, Abe was commander of the 6th Base Force at Kwajalein in the Marshall Islands. As such, he was essentially the wartime military governor of the Marshall Islands, Gilbert Islands, Nauru, Ocean Island and Wake Island in the central Pacific Ocean.

On August 17–18, 1942, a force of approximately 200 US Marine commandos landed by submarine and raided Makin Island. The Makin Island raid was intended to destroy Japanese installations, gather intelligence data, test raiding tactics, boost home front morale, and possibly to divert Japanese attention from Guadalcanal. At a loss of 30 men, the US Marines killed the 85-160 Japanese on the island, destroyed the radio station, fuel depot, supplies and installations. The raid attracted much attention in the American press, spawning a 1943 propaganda movie entitled Gung Ho!. Nine US Marines who had been accidentally left behind during the raid were captured by Japanese forces, and moved as prisoners of war to Kwajalein, where they were held for about a month.

The initial plan was to send those American prisoners to Japan for incarceration. However, reportedly over the protests of Captain Yoshio Obara (a local Japanese commander on Kwajalein) and Commander Hiusakichi Naiki (the chief of military police on Kwajalein), Abe ordered the execution of the prisoners by beheading on October 16, 1942.

Subsequent career
From December 27, 1943 – April 25, 1945, Abe was Commandant of the Tateyama Naval Gunnery School in Tateyama, Chiba, Japan. Until the end of the war, he served as a commander of base units at Sasebo Naval Base in Kyūshū, Japan.

After the war, Abe was arrested by SCAP authorities and charged with war crimes, largely based on witness testimony regarding the Makin Raid Incident. Abe was extradited to Guam, where a military tribunal convicted him on May 23, 1946, of "violation of the law and custom of war and the moral standards of civilized society." Abe was executed by hanging on June 19, 1947, in Guam. His remains were not returned to his family.

Obara was sentenced to 10 years in prison, and Naiki to five years in prison, for their roles in the executions.

References

Printed sources

 - Neutral review of this book: 

Young, Howard. "Carlson's Raiders on Makin, 17–18 August 1942", Marine Corps Gazette 87(8): August 31, 2003.

External links
 - Briefly describes the Makin Raid and its impact on future U.S. operations in the Gilbert Islands.

Notes

1892 births
1947 deaths
Massacres in 1942
Executed military leaders
People from Yamagata Prefecture
Japanese admirals of World War II
Japanese mass murderers
Japanese people executed for war crimes
Japanese people executed abroad
Perpetrators of World War II prisoner of war massacres
People executed by the United States military by hanging
Executed mass murderers